Siófok is a town in Somogy County, Hungary on the southern bank of Lake Balaton. It is the second largest municipality in Somogy County and the seat of Siófok District. It covers an area of about 124.66 km2 (48.13 square miles) between Lake Balaton, the Mezőföld and the Outer Somogy-Hills. Lying at the firth of the Sió Channel, it serves as the most important logistic station for goods between Lake Balaton and the River Danube.

The town is Hungary's second most popular holiday destination (right after Budapest) thanks to its 17-kilometre-long (11 miles) coast, over 1,000 hotels, and plenty of bars, restaurants and night clubs. Siófok is one of the richest municipalities of Hungary due to tourism. Hungarians often call the town "the capital of Lake Balaton", as it is the largest town on its shores and acts as the financial, cultural, media, commercial and touristic hub of the northern part of Somogy County and the southern shore of Lake Balaton.

Etymology
Fuk was first mentioned as a village name in 1137 among the taxpayer communities. In the Tabula Hungariae (published in 1528) it appears as Fok. The word composition Siófok has been in use since 1790.

History

Ancient times
The area of today's Siófok was already inhabited in the time of the Roman Empire. The Roman conquest came there in the 1st century AD. The town lay on the route leading from Sopianae (today Pécs) through Tricciana (today Ságvár) to Arrabona (today Győr). According to recordings of Sextus Aurelius Victor from the 3rd to 4th century AD, Emperor Galerius built a sluice in 292 AD to drain the Lacus Pelso (the Latin name of Lake Balaton) in the area of Siófok and cleared forests.

Middle Ages
After the Hungarian Conquest, the settlement is mentioned in the Tihany Abbey's founding letter from 1055 as the following: "Rivulus namque, qui dicitur Fuk fluens" which means that a small brook, also called Fuk (today Sió) comes from the Lake Balaton. It also states that people had a passage through an older bridge and a ford as well.

After the Second Mongol invasion of Hungary, Fok was resettled.

In 1552, the Ottoman Empire took Fok and his surroundings. Siófok became a military outpost of the Ottomans who also built a fortress there. The Siófok Castle stood on the Granarium Hill near the place where the hospital is located today. Two years after the Siege of Buda (1686) the region was liberated from the Ottoman occupation. Fok became the property of the Chapter of Veszprém, who settled people there, and in 1693 built a wooden church for them.

Habsburg times
At the time of Rákóczi's War of Independence, the famous Sió Defence Line of János Bottyán ended at the Fortress of Siófok. 1705 Francis II Rákóczi, Prince of Transylvania, donated a seal to the village which serves today as the coat of arms of Siófok.

The Baroque parish church was built in honor of the Immaculate Conception in 1736.

Major industrial progress began in the settlement during the 19th century. From 1810 the Transylvania-Adria Mail Coach Route already ran through Siófok. The first independent post office operated there since 1867.

Water regulation began in 1810 in the village. Then, based on the idea of József Beszédes, a water engineer, the bed of the Sió was cleaned, mills were re-operated, the water level of Lake Balaton dropped by one meter, so 51,000 acres of land was freed from the water of Lake Balaton, and further 6,000 acres of free land was created on the area of the Sió.

The establishment of the Balatoni Gőzhajózási Részvénytársaság ("Balaton Steam Shipping Company") in 1846 brought a significant change in the life of the settlement. Lajos Kossuth, who personally wrote the charter of the business association, and István Széchenyi as the president of the company played a huge role in it. In the same year, on September 21, the first steamboat on the Lake Balaton, Kisfaludy was released into the water.

In 1861 the railway between Buda and Nagykanizsa was officially opened. The train station was completed in 1863 (although the train stopped there since 1861), and a year later, the first port protected by pier was built. In the same year, a new sluice on the Sió was opened, to control the water level of Lake Balaton. The wooden sluice was replaced by an iron one in 1893. The settlement was awarded the rank of market town in 1865, which meant a permit for holding national fair. At that time, Siófok was still small with 200 houses and 1,500 residents.

In Siófok, or as many people called it at that time, Zsidófok (zsidó meaning "Jew" in Hungarian, according to sources, it was more a descriptive than a pejorative expression) once lived a large number of Jewish community. At the beginning of the 1860s, their number was 347, with 70 merchants living here, who played a major role in making the city an attractive resort in Europe.

In 1866, the first advertisement of the settlement was published in the Zala-Somogy Bulletin entitled Balatontavi Fürdő Siófok. Ignác Vég' tenant made a 12-year bathing lease contract with the Chapter of Veszprém, which has been extended for another 12 years. Built in 1878, the Magyar Tenger ("Hungarian Sea") bathhouse, created according to the plans of the Neuschlass construction company, in Swiss style, with an ornate façade, a hundred-person lounge, large windows that looked at the water, a double-deck viewing room, eighty bath cabins.

The Chapter of Veszprém began to parcel plots in 1885 and the construction of today's bathing area began. It is an interesting attraction of the Balaton landscape that the majority of the first villa owners were painters: Mór Than, Pál Vágó, Tivadar Feledi-Flesch (Mihály Zichy's son-in-law) and Artúr Tölgyessy's villa were in Siófok at this time.

In 1888 Gábor Baross granted state aid for the reorganization of the Balatoni Gőzhajózási Részvénytársaság ("Balaton Steam Shipping Company"). In 1889, the new passenger ship, the Kelén, was launched, and in 1891 Helka and the new Kelén were completed.

In April 1891, the Siófok Balatonfürdő Rt ("Siófok Balaton Bath Corporation") was founded which redeemed the bath rights from the Chapter of Veszprém and bought a 60 acre area to build houses and parks. From 1884 to 1905, the leader of the company was Henrik Glatz, founder of Franklin Irodalmi és Nyomdai Rt. Major hotels opened: Sió, Hullám, and later the Central Hotel.

In 1900, the Balatoni Halászati Részvénytársaság ("Balaton Fishing Company") started its operations. In the same year, the horse racing venue was built with a stand for 1,500 people. The town was also the destination of the most visited swimming and tennis competitions at Lake Balaton.

Because of its busy lifestyle, Siófok became a popular place of residence for several Hungarian artists and actors (e.g. Frigyes Karinthy, Gyula Krúdy, Árpád Latabár, Gyula Kabos).

In 1904 the new railway station building was completed. On October 23, 1906, the railway connection with Kaposvár was established through the Mocsolád-Tab-Siófok railway.

During the world wars 
In August 1919, Siófok stood at the center of national politics for a short time, after Miklós Horthy, preparing for the suppression of the Hungarian Soviet Republic, moved to the area of Siófok and established his headquarters there.

At the end of World War II, the settlement was heavily damaged because the front line got stuck for two months there.

During World War II, nearly 500 Jews were deported in 1944, of whom only 72 returned.

Soviet era
In 1947, within the framework of the construction works of the Sió Channel, the new sluice was completed, which made it possible for ships to move through. From 1950, the settlement belongs to Somogy County and in the same year it became a district seat.

On December 31, 1968 Siófok became a city. Before that, the 400-bed hospital was built, and then the cultural center and town library. In 1971, the M7 motorway from the direction of Budapest reached the settlement. Later, Siófok became the most famous corporate holiday destination.

After 1989
After 1990, a local newspaper and open-air local television began to operate in the city.

The first high-speed telegraphy World Championship was hosted in Siófok in 1995.

Geography

In Siófok, the canal Sió flows out of the lake.

Climate
Climate in this area has mild differences between highs and lows, and there is adequate rainfall year-round.  The Köppen climate classification subtype for this climate is "Cfb" (Marine West Coast Climate/Oceanic climate).

Economy
Although Siófok is known for its tourism and service sector there are some companies working in production. Several smaller firms and farmers are in the agricultural industry, especially in fruit production. The town's famous products are the Sió fruit juices in several tastes. Their producer is the Sió-Eckes company (part of the German Eckes).

The Hungarian stationery producer SOMOGY REHAB, the Hungarian aluminium tent manufacturer Alutent, the Hungarian water supply infrastructure manufacturer Kristály, the Hungarian ready-mixed concrete producer TBG Interbeton (part of the Mexican Cemex) and the Hungarian plastic manufacturer Kaona are all based in the town.

The Norwegian cable producer Kongsberg Automotive and the Hungarian gas transport infrastructure manufacturer OV Industries have production facilities there.

Most of the companies can be found in the town's industrial park, Adria Ipari Park .

Siófok is home to the headquarter of Bahart (Balatoni Hajózási Zrt) which is the owner and operator of 11 sailing ports around Lake Balaton (Balatonföldvár, Balatonszemes, Balatonlelle, Balatonboglár, Fonyód, Szigliget, Badacsony, Balatonfüred, Csopak, Alsóörs and Siófok), as well as provider of scheduled cruise ship voyages, ferries, water taxis and organizer of regattas.

Top companies

Services and public transportation
Siófok is reachable by train through the main Railway station or by regional buses operated by DDKK. Siófok-Kiliti airport is a small local airport serving only smaller airplanes. The city has 8 local buslines (2, 2K, 3, 4, 7, 16, 61, 64) which run everyday and are operated by DDKK.

Shopping/Retail
 Sio Plaza (Major shopping mall in downtown Siófok)
 Park Center
 Tesco
 Tesco Express
 Lidl (food retail)
 Spar (food retail)
 Real (food retail)
 CBA
 Coop (food retail)
 Siófriss (convenience store)
 Marci ABC (convenience store)
 Marci Éden ABC (convenience store)
 dm (drugstore)
 Rossmann (drugstore)

Demographics

Populated places in Somogy County
Lake Balaton
Tourism in Hungary